Um das Menschenrecht is a 1934 German film directed by Hans Zöberlein and Ludwig Schmid-Wildy.

Plot summary

Cast

Soundtrack

External links 

1934 films
1934 drama films
German drama films
Films of Nazi Germany
1930s German-language films
German black-and-white films
Nazi propaganda films
Films set in 1919
1930s German films